Alex Stewart may refer to:

 Alex Stewart (boxer) (1964–2016), English boxer
 Alex Stewart (writer) (born 1958), writer (who also goes by the name Sandy Mitchell)
 Alex Stewart (American football) (born 1964), Jamaican-born American football defensive end
 Alex Stewart (Australian footballer) (1908–1993), Australian rules footballer
 Alex Stewart (goalkeeper), Scottish football goalkeeper
 Alex Stewart (forward), Scottish football forward, son of goalkeeper above
 Richard Gordon (Scottish author) (1947–2009), Scottish author who wrote under the pen name Alex Stewart
 Alex Stewart, runner up on the American dating show ''Love Island

See also
Alexander Stewart (disambiguation)
Alex Stuart (disambiguation)
Alexander Stuart (disambiguation)
Alec Stewart (disambiguation)